Becky Ruehl (born December 23, 1977) is an American former diver. She competed in the women's 10 metre platform event at the 1996 Summer Olympics.

References

External links
 

1977 births
Living people
American female divers
Olympic divers of the United States
Divers at the 1996 Summer Olympics
People from Kenton County, Kentucky
21st-century American women
Pan American Games bronze medalists for the United States
Medalists at the 1995 Pan American Games
Divers at the 1995 Pan American Games
Pan American Games medalists in diving